Jan Gruber (born 15 March 1984, in Prague) is a Czech rower. He competed for the Czech Republic as a member of the men's coxless four team which finished 5th at the 2008 Summer Olympics.

See also 
 Czech Republic at the 2008 Summer Olympics#Rowing

References 
 
 

1984 births
Living people
Czech male rowers
Rowers from Prague
Olympic rowers of the Czech Republic
Rowers at the 2008 Summer Olympics
European Rowing Championships medalists